Anhelina Kalinina was the defending champion but chose not to participate.

Jule Niemeier won the title, defeating Réka Luca Jani in the final, 6–2, 6–2.

Seeds

Draw

Finals

Top half

Bottom half

References

Main Draw

Zagreb Ladies Open - Singles